Bloody Milk is a 2017 French drama film directed by Hubert Charuel in his feature debut. It was presented at the 2017 Cannes Film Festival, during the International Critics' Week.

Cast
 Swann Arlaud as Pierre Chavanges
 Sara Giraudeau as Pascale Chavanges
 Bouli Lanners as Jamy
 Isabelle Candelier as Madame Chavanges
 Jean-Paul Charuel as Monsieur Chavanges
 India Hair as Angélique
 Géraldine Martineau as Emma
 Valentin Lespinasse as Jean-Denis
 Clément Bresson as Fabrice
 Jean Charuel as Raymond
 Julian Janeczko as Thomas
 Franc Bruneau as Régis
 Claude Le Pape as Francine

Release
The film had its world premiere at the Cannes Film Festival, during the International Critics' Week, on 20 May 2017. It was released in French theaters on 30 August 2017.

Reception

Box office
Bloody Milk grossed $0 in North America and $3.8 million in France, against a production budget of about $3.9 million.

Critical response
The film holds a 75% approval rating on review aggregator website Rotten Tomatoes, based on 8 reviews, with a weighted average of 7/10.

Accolades

See also
 2017 in film

References

External links
 

2017 films
2017 drama films
2017 directorial debut films
French drama films
2010s French-language films
Best First Feature Film César Award winners
Films featuring a Best Actor César Award-winning performance
Films featuring a Best Supporting Actress César Award-winning performance
Films about farmers
Films about cattle
2010s French films